Francis II (Neapolitan and , christened Francesco d'Assisi Maria Leopoldo; ; 16 January 1836 – 27 December 1894) was King of the Two Sicilies from 1859 to 1861. He was the last King of the Two Sicilies, as successive invasions by Giuseppe Garibaldi and Victor Emmanuel II of Sardinia ultimately brought an end to his rule, as part of Italian unification. After he was deposed, the Kingdom of the Two Sicilies and the Kingdom of Sardinia were merged into the newly formed Kingdom of Italy.

Biography

Early life
The only son and heir of King Ferdinand II of the Two Sicilies by his first wife, Maria Christina of Savoy, Francis II was the last of the Bourbon kings of Naples, where he was born in 1836. His education had been much neglected and he proved a man of weak character, greatly influenced by his stepmother Archduchess Maria Theresa of Austria, whom he feared, and also by the priests, and by the camarilla, or reactionary court set.

On 3 February 1859 in Bari, Francis married Duchess Maria Sophie of Bavaria, of the royal Bavarian house of Wittelsbach (a younger sister of Empress Elisabeth "Sissi" of Austria). Maria Sophie, along with Elisabeth, was a great beauty. However, their marriage was unhappy.
Their only daughter, Maria Cristina, was born ten years after her parents married, and lived only three months (24 December 1869 – 28 March 1870).

Reign
Francis II took the throne on 22 May 1859, after the death of his father. For the post of prime minister he at once appointed Carlo Filangieri, who, realizing the importance of the Franco-Piedmontese victories in Lombardy, advised Francis II to accept the alliance with the Kingdom of Sardinia proposed by Cavour. On 7 June, a part of the Swiss Guard mutinied, and while the king mollified them by promising to redress their grievances, General Alessandro Nunziante gathered his troops, who surrounded the mutineers and shot them down. The incident resulted in the disbanding of the whole Swiss Guard, at the time the strongest bulwark of the Bourbon dynasty.

Cavour again proposed an alliance to divide the Papal States between Piedmont and Naples (the province of Rome excepted), but Francis rejected an idea which to him seemed like heresy. Filangieri strongly advocated a Constitution as the only measure which might save the dynasty, but on the king’s refusal he resigned.

Garibaldi's invasion

Meanwhile, the revolutionary parties were conspiring for the overthrow of the Bourbons in Calabria and Sicily, and Giuseppe Garibaldi was preparing for a raid in the south of Italy. A conspiracy in Sicily was discovered and the plotters punished with brutal severity, but Rosalino Pilo and Francesco Crispi, who had organized the movement, escaped execution. When Garibaldi landed at Marsala (May 1860) with his Expedition of the Thousand, he conquered the island with astonishing ease.

These events at last coaxed Francis II into granting a constitution, but its promulgation was followed by disorders in Naples and the resignation of several ministers; Liborio Romano became head of the government. The disintegration of the army and navy proceeded apace, and Cavour sent a Piedmontese squadron carrying troops on board to watch over these events. Garibaldi, who had crossed the strait of Messina, was advancing northwards and was everywhere received by the people as a liberator. After long hesitations and even an appeal to Garibaldi himself, and on the advice of Romano, Francis II left Naples on 6 September with his wife Maria Sophia, the court and the diplomatic corps (except the French and British ministers), and went by sea to Gaeta, where a large part of the army was concentrated.

The next day Garibaldi entered Naples, was enthusiastically welcomed, and formed a provisional government.

Piedmontese invasion
King Victor Emmanuel II had decided on the invasion of the Papal States, and after occupying Umbria and the Marche entered the Neapolitan kingdom. Garibaldi’s troops defeated the Neapolitan royalists at the Battle of Volturno (which took place on 1 October 1860), while the Piedmontese captured Capua.

By late 1860, only Gaeta, Messina, and Civitella del Tronto still held out. The Siege of Gaeta by the Piedmontese began on 6 November 1860. Both Francis II and his wife behaved with great coolness and courage. Even when the French fleet, whose presence had hitherto prevented an attack by sea, was withdrawn, they still resisted. It was not until 13 February 1861 that the fortress capitulated.

Overthrow
Thus, the Kingdom of the Two Sicilies ceased to exist and its territory was incorporated into that of the Kingdom of Sardinia (soon renamed the Kingdom of Italy), and Francis II was deposed. Francis and Maria Sophia first lived in Rome as guests of the Pope, where they maintained a government in exile recognized by some Catholic powers including France, Spain, Austria and Bavaria. After the Prussian victory against Austria in 1866 and subsequent expansion of Italian territory, they disbanded this government and left Rome before it was occupied by the Italians in 1870. They led a wandering life from then on, living in Austria, France, and Bavaria. In 1894, Francis died at Arco in Trentino (now north-eastern Italy, but at the time in Austria-Hungary). His widow survived him by 31 years and died in Munich. Upon the death of Francis II, his half-brother, Prince Alfonso, became the pretender to the throne of the Kingdom of the Two Sicilies.

Cause of beatification and canonization 
On 11 December 2020, the cause of the beatification of King Francis II of the Two Sicilies was introduced by the Cardinal Crescenzio Sepe, the Archbishop of Naples. Pope Francis declared the king a Servant of God.

Honours 

 : Grand Cordon of the Order of Leopold, 9 June 1855
 : Knight of the Order of the Golden Fleece, 15 June 1844
 : Grand Cross of the Order of Pedro I
 :
 Grand Cross of the Order of St. Stephen, 1849
 Knight of the Military Order of Maria Theresa, 1861
 : Grand Cross of the Order of St. Louis
  Kingdom of Prussia:
 Knight of the Order of the Black Eagle, 4 June 1853
 Pour le Mérite (military), 20 February 1861
 : Knight of the Order of Saint Hubert, 1857
 : Knight of the Order of the Rue Crown, 1860
  Grand Duchy of Tuscany: Grand Cross of the Order of St. Joseph
 : Grand Cross of the Order of the Württemberg Crown, 1864

Ancestors

See also

 History of Italy
 Siege of Gaeta

References

External links
 

1836 births
1894 deaths
Princes of Bourbon-Two Sicilies
Monarchs of the Kingdom of the Two Sicilies
Deaths from diabetes
Burials at the Basilica of Santa Chiara
Grand Crosses of the Order of Saint Stephen of Hungary
Knights Cross of the Military Order of Maria Theresa
Knights of the Golden Fleece of Spain
Recipients of the Pour le Mérite (military class)
19th-century Roman Catholics
Italian Roman Catholics
Italian Servants of God
19th-century venerated Christians
Roman Catholic royal saints
Royal reburials